Traffic Safety and the Driver is a book authored by Leonard Evans.

Reception
While the data presented is in some regards dated, the concepts apply now as they did then.  This book has been repeatedly referred to as a classic in the fields of traffic safety, vehicle safety, and crash prevention.  It has been positively reviewed by most of the world's most influential technical journals in relevant fields.
Traffic Safety and the Driver is now largely eclipsed by the author's more recent book Traffic Safety, which has received similarly enthusiastic reviews.

Chapter headings
The book was organized as follows:

 Introduction
 Effects of Sex and Age
 An Overview of US Traffic Fatalities
 Engineering, Roadway and Environmental Factors
 Driver Performance
 Driver Behavior
 Alcohol's Role in Traffic Crashes
 Drunk Driving Countermeasures
 Effectiveness of Occupant Protection Devices When Used
 Restraint-Use Laws, Use Rates, and Field Effectiveness
 User Responses to Changes in Traffic Systems
 How You Can Reduce Your Risk
 An Attempt to Estimate the Relative Importance of Factors
 Traffic Safety in Broader Contexts
 Conclusions

References

Further reading

Automotive safety
Handbooks and manuals
2004 non-fiction books